J. Robert Schaetzel (January 28, 1917 – November 7, 2003) was an American diplomat who served as the United States Ambassador to the European Union from 1966 to 1972.

He died of pneumonia on November 7, 2003, in Bethesda, Maryland at age 86.

References

1917 births
2003 deaths
Ambassadors of the United States to the European Union
20th-century American diplomats